Staatsbosbeheer, founded in 1899, is a Dutch government organization for forestry and the management of nature reserves.

Staatsbosbeheer currently oversees over 250,000 hectares of land in the Netherlands. Usually this land is open to the public for recreational purposes, but restrictions often apply. Examples are the compulsory use of a leash when bringing a dog, or daytime access only.

The organization has been criticized for not taking close enough care of its lands, or for interfering with political decisions, but news reports are generally positive or simply report public service announcements from the organization.

While the literal translation of the name would be 'State Forest Management', forests only make up 900 square kilometres of the total land under supervision. The remaining land consists of varying landscapes such as dunes, polders and wetlands.

Chairpersons

Notable areas under supervision by Staatsbosbeheer
Bargerveen
De Biesbosch
Donkse Laagten
Oostvaardersplassen
Strubben-Kniphorstbos
Utrechtse Heuvelrug National Park
Wierickerschans

References

External links

 Staatsbosbeheer, official website

Environment of the Netherlands
Organizations established in 1899